St. Francis de Sales High School or DeSales High School may refer to various Catholic high schools named for Francis de Sales:

 St. Francis De'Sales High School, Nagpur, Maharashtra, India
 St. Francis de Sales High School (Chicago, Illinois)
 DeSales High School (Louisville, Kentucky)
 Vandebilt Catholic High School, Louisiana; formerly named St. Francis de Sales Catholic High School
 St. Francis de Sales High School (Detroit, Michigan)
 DeSales High School (Geneva, New York)
 St. Francis DeSales High School (Columbus, Ohio)
 St. Francis de Sales School (Toledo, Ohio)
 Desales Catholic High School (Walla Walla, Washington)

See also
 St. Francis de Sales School (disambiguation)
 Saint Francis High School (disambiguation)